Trimethyl ammonium compounds are a type of quaternary ammonium compound with three methyl groups at the nitrogen, with a more complicated carbon chain derivative at the fourth position.

Examples include:
 Betaine
 Bethanechol
 Carnitine and its derivatives
 Choline and its derivatives
 Methacholine
 Muscarine
 Trimethylglycine

External links
 

Quaternary ammonium compounds
Chemistry-related lists